Lake Bastrop is a reservoir on Spicer Creek in the Colorado River basin 3 miles (5 km) northeast of the town of Bastrop in central Bastrop County, Texas, United States.  The reservoir was formed in 1964 by the construction of a dam by the Lower Colorado River Authority.  The lake serves primarily as a power plant cooling pond for the Sim Gideon Power Plant operated by the LCRA and the Lost Pines Power Project 1, owned by GenTex Power Corporation, a wholly owned affiliate of the LCRA.  Lake Bastrop also serves as a venue for outdoor recreation, including fishing, boating, swimming, camping and picnicking, and is maintained at a constant level year round.

Approximately one quarter of the shoreline of the Lake is privately owned by the Capitol Area Council, Boy Scouts of America. This property is used for the Lost Pines Scout Reservation, consisting of Cub World at Camp Tom Wooten, for Cub Scouts and Lost Pines Boy Scout Camp, for Boy Scouts. The Scouts leased the property from the LCRA starting in 1965, buying the land in the late 1990s.

Fish populations
Lake Bastrop has been stocked with species of fish intended to improve the utility of the reservoir for recreational fishing.  Fish present in Lake Bastrop include catfish, crappie, perch, sunfish, carp, and largemouth bass.

Recreational uses
The Lower Colorado River Authority maintains two public parks, North Shore Park and South Shore Park, on the lake, both of which provide campsites for rent.

Water Conditions  
Water Clarity : Annually clear , however occasionally stained.

Water Structure: Lake provides a high density of aquatic vegetation , providing multiple habitats.

Water Levels: Annually will fluctuate 1 to 2 feet depending on time of year.

References

External links
South Shore Park - Lower Colorado River Authority
North Shore Park - Lower Colorado River Authority
Lake Bastrop - Texas Parks & Wildlife
Lake Bastrop - Handbook of Texas Online
- Capitol Area Council-Boy Scouts of America

Bastrop
Protected areas of Bastrop County, Texas
Bodies of water of Bastrop County, Texas
Cooling ponds